Izquierdo (Spanish for "left") is a Spanish surname. Notable people with the surname include:

Calixto Garcia de Luna e Izquierdo, merchant born in Soria, Castilla c. 1768
Elisa Izquierdo (1989–1995), six-year-old girl from the USA, beaten to death by her mother
Hank Izquierdo (1931–2015), Cuban Major League Baseball player
Hansel Izquierdo (born 1977), retired Major League Baseball pitcher
Ivan Izquierdo, Argentine Brazilian scientist and neurobiologist
José Heriberto Izquierdo Mena (born 1992), Colombian footballer
José Izquierdo (footballer born 1980) (born 1980), Spanish footballer
Jose Izquierdo Encarnacion 19th Secretary of State of the Commonwealth of Puerto Rico
J. P. Izquierdo (born 1969), Canadian football player
Julio Izquierdo Labrado (born 1958), Spanish writer and doctor of history
Lilia Izquierdo (born 1967), former female volleyball player from Cuba, thrice Olympic gold medallist
Manuel Izquierdo (1928–2009), sculptor and woodcut artist
María Izquierdo (artist) (1902–1955), Mexican painter
María Izquierdo (actress) (born 1960), Chilean actress
María Izquierdo Rojo (born 1946), Spanish politician
Miguel Ramón Izquierdo (1919–2007), Spanish politician, mayor of Valencia
Rafael de Izquierdo y Gutiérrez, Spanish Military Officer, became Governor-General of the Philippines 1871–1873
Vicente Guillén Izquierdo (born 1958), Spanish politician who belongs to the governing PSOE

See also
Izquierdo (crater), crater on Mercury located to the east of Beagle Rupes and Sveinsdóttir crater

Spanish-language surnames